Jerk is the second album by Canadian alternative/indie rock band hHead, released in 1994. The prize money that hHead won from a CFNY-FM contest went towards paying the costs for making this album. Some critics say that this album sounded a lot more 'produced' than the previous album, Fireman, mainly because of the style change, from a garagey sound to a more professional sound.

Videos were made for "Answers" and "Happy".

Track listing
"Remedial" - 3:25
"Answers" - 3:52
"Happy" - 5:18
"University" - 3:22
"Gipped" - 5:19
"Jerk" - 4:00
"Love" - 4:05
"She's" - 4:38
"Better" - 4:30
"Stillborn" - 4:41
"Will" - 5:26
"Pimp" - 5:24
"Stain" - 5:09

Credits
Noah Mintz - Guitar/Vocals
Brendan Canning - Bass
Mark Bartkiw - drums
Dave Ogilvie - Producer, Engineer
Lewis Dimitri - Assistant Engineer
Aubry Mintz - hHead Logo
Allison Leach - Cover Photo
Howie Wineberg - Mastering
Vicky Law (Fai Cheung) - HK Journalist

1994 albums
HHead albums
I.R.S. Records albums